Saint-Éloi (French for Saint Eligius) may refer to:
Saint-Éloi, Quebec, Canada
Saint-Éloi, Ain, France
Saint-Éloi, Creuse, France
Saint-Éloi, Nièvre, France
Saint-Éloi-de-Fourques, Eure, France

See also
 Saint-Éloy (disambiguation)
 Sint-Elooi, Belgium (also known as St. Eloi near Ypres)